Bedford/St. Martin's is an American publishing company specializing in humanities college  textbooks. Bedford/St. Martin's is part of the Bedford, Freeman, and Worth Publishing group owned by the Macmillan Publishers, which is in turn owned by the Stuttgart-based Georg von Holtzbrinck Publishing Group. Its offices are located in Boston and New York. The company was founded in 1981 by Charles Christensen and Joan Feinberg as Bedford Books, an imprint of St. Martin's Press.

Among others works, Bedford/St. Martin's has published The Bedford Handbook and A Writer's Reference by Diana Hacker, Patterns for College Writing, The Bedford Reader, The American Promise, Ways of the World and Writer's Help.

In 2013, Bedfor/St. Martin's made a deal with Coursera to offer instructional materials.

References

External links 
 
 BSM History

Academic publishing companies

Book publishing companies based in New York (state)
Publishing companies based in New York City
Companies based in Boston
Publishing companies established in 1981
1981 establishments in the United States
Holtzbrinck Publishing Group